Keith John Charles Bradley, Baron Bradley,  (born 17 May 1950, in Birmingham) is a British Labour Party politician and life peer. He was formerly the Labour Member of Parliament (MP) for Manchester Withington from 1987 until 2005.

Early life
He went to Bishop Vesey's Grammar School in Sutton Coldfield. He studied at Aston University, gaining a DipAcct in 1970. From Manchester Polytechnic (now Manchester Metropolitan University), he gained a BA in Social Science in 1976. From the University of York, he gained an MPhil in 1978.

He worked for the chartered accountants Charles Impey & Co from 1969–73. He was a research officer for Manchester City Council Housing Department from 1978–81. From 1981–7, he was Secretary of Stockport Community Health Council.

Parliamentary career
He was first elected as Member of Parliament (MP) for the constituency at the 1987 general election, having served as a councillor in Old Moat Ward (Manchester) since 1983.  After the 1997 general election he became a junior minister at the Department of Social Security, and then became Deputy Chief Whip and Treasurer of the Queen's Household in 1998.  He was a junior minister in the Home Office for Criminal Justice, Sentencing, and Law Reform from 2001–2, and then a backbench MP and member of the Health Select Committee.  He is a member of the Privy Council. Bradley lost his seat in Parliament when he was defeated by a swing of over 17% to the Liberal Democrat candidate, John Leech, in the 2005 general election.

In April 2006 it was announced that Keith Bradley would become a working life peer in the House of Lords, and he became Baron Bradley, of Withington in the County of Greater Manchester on 12 June 2006. Lord Bradley is also a Special Adviser to the President and Vice-Chancellor of the University of Manchester.

In October 2006 it was announced that Keith Bradley had been appointed to the board of The Christie Hospital as a non executive director. He was appointed Chair of the Trust in May 2011.  In February 2014 he announced that he would resign from the board as a consequences of disagreements about the way in which the suspension of the Chief Executive was being handled.

Personal life
Lord Bradley and his wife, Rhona Bradley, have two sons (Matthew and Jonathan) and a daughter (Rebecca). He married Rhona Ann Graham in 1987. He was criticized for sending Jonathan to Manchester Grammar School. His sister, Sally Bradley and her partner William (Billy) Harrop, were killed on Sunday 21 April during breakfast at one of the Hotels in the 2019 Sri Lanka Easter bombings.

References

External links
 Ask Aristotle
 They Work For You
 

1950 births
Living people
Bradley, Keith Bradley, Baron
Bradley, Keith Bradley, Baron
Labour Party (UK) MPs for English constituencies
UK MPs 1987–1992
UK MPs 1992–1997
UK MPs 1997–2001
UK MPs 2001–2005
Alumni of Aston University
Alumni of the University of York
Alumni of Manchester Metropolitan University
People from Sutton Coldfield
People from Birmingham, West Midlands
Treasurers of the Household
People educated at Bishop Vesey's Grammar School
Life peers created by Elizabeth II